The 1960–61 season was Tottenham Hotspur Football Club's 43rd of competitive football and 11th consecutive year in the English top flight. It was also the club's most successful year ever up to that point, as they won the Football League First Division for the second time and the FA Cup for the third time, thus becoming the third English club to achieve the league and FA Cup Double.

Results

Final league table

First Division
Tottenham were crowned champions after their game against Sheffield Wednesday at White Hart Lane, which they won 2–1.

Source:

FA Cup

Source:

Players used

Top scorer

Most appearances

Source:

First Division results by round

References

Stats

Tottenham Hotspur F.C. seasons
Tottenham Hotspur F.C.
1961